Andrex (1907–1989) was a French film actor. Andrex was a close friend of the comedian Fernandel and appeared in many films alongside him.

He was married to the actress Ginette Baudin.

Partial filmography

 Toine (1932)
 Le coq du régiment (1933)
 Les Bleus de la marine (1934) - Le lieutenant
 Angèle (1934) - Louis
 Toni (1935) - Gabi
 Ferdinand le noceur (1935) - Un client du bordel (uncredited)
 La brigade en jupons (1936)
 Josette (1937) - Lucien
 Les dégourdis de la 11ème (1937) - Le sergent
 Ignace (1937) - Serge de Montroc
 Life Dances On (1937) - Paul
 Gribouille (1937) - Robert
 L'affaire du courrier de Lyon (1937) - L'avocat de Lesurques
 La Marseillaise (1938) - Honoré Arnaud
 The Strange Monsieur Victor (1938) - Robert Cerani
 Barnabé (1938) - André Dubreuil
 Vacances payées (1938) - Gangster #1
 Le dompteur (1938) - Bertrand
 Hôtel du Nord (1938) - Kenel
 Les gangsters du château d'If (1939) - Bimbo
 The Five Cents of Lavarede (1939) - Jim Strong
 Behind the Facade (1939) - André Laurent, l'employé de banque
 Nightclub Hostess (1939) - Marcel
 Fric-Frac (1939) - Petit-Louis
 Extenuating Circumstances (1939) - Môme de Dieu (Kid of God)
 Une idée à l'eau (1940) - Le deuxième scénariste
 Parade en sept nuits (1941) - Tonin - le séducteur
 Le club des soupirants (1941) - Maxime
 Un chapeau de paille d'Italie (1941) - Achille de Rosalba
 Simplet (1942) - Rascasse
 Les petits riens (1942) - Mesnard
 A Woman in the Night (1943) - Le charbonnier
 La bonne étoile (1943) - Maurice Carissol
 Le mistral (1943) - Charles
 Madly in Love (1943) - Ulysse
 Madame et son flirt (1946) - Gérard Sauvaget
 The Woman in Red (1947) - Le chef des gangsters
 The Three Cousins (1947) - Claude
 Manon (1949) - Le trafiquant
 The Heroic Monsieur Boniface (1949) - Charlie
 Uniformes et grandes manoeuvres (1950) - André Duroc
 The Sleepwalker (1951) - Charlie, le chef des gangsters
 Adhémar ou le jouet de la fatalité (1951) - Tisalé
 La Table-aux-crevés (1951) - Frédéric Gari
 The Sheep Has Five Legs (1954) - Un marin
 Spring, Autumn and Love (1955) - Blancard
 Four Days in Paris (1955) - Le brigadier
 If Paris Were Told to Us (1956) - Paulus
 If All the Guys in the World (1956) - Le docteur Lagarrigue
 Les promesses dangereuses (1956)
 The Virtuous Bigamist (1956) - Frédéric
 Honoré de Marseille (1956) - Pastèque
 Vacances explosives! (1957) - Joe Ravello dit Monsieur Jo
 Paris clandestin (1957) - Max
 C'est arrivé à 36 chandelles (1957) - Andrex (uncredited)
 La p... sentimentale (1958) - Tony - le souteneur
 Interpol Against X (1960) - Mathias
 Cocagne (1961) - Amedee
 Magnet of Doom (1963) - M. Andrei
 Monsieur (1964) - Antoine
 L'Âge ingrat (1964) - Le camionneur (uncredited)
 Your Money or Your Life (1966) - Le chef de convoi
 La honte de la famille (1969) - Etouvant
 Charles and Lucie (1979) - Le patron du bar 'Quand même' (uncredited)
 Cap Canaille (1983) - Pascal Andreucci (final film role)

References

Bibliography
 Andrew, Dudley. Mists of Regret: Culture and Sensibility in Classic French Film. Princeton University Press, 1995.

External links

1907 births
1989 deaths
French male film actors
Male actors from Marseille